Jeanne Rongier (November 27, 1852 – January 19, 1929) was a French painter.

Rongier was born in Mâcon where she took lessons from Henri Senart. She later took lessons from Henri Joseph Harpignies, and Evariste Vital Luminais. She is known for historic genre works after old masters such as Frans Hals and Jacob Duck.

Rongier exhibited her work at the Pennsylvania Building, the Palace of Fine Arts and The Woman's Building at the 1893 World's Columbian Exposition in Chicago, Illinois.

Her painting Sitting for a portrait in 1806, was included in the 1905 book Women Painters of the World.

References

External links
 Jeanne Rongier on artnet

1852 births
1929 deaths
People from Mâcon
French women painters
19th-century French painters
20th-century French painters
19th-century French women artists
20th-century French women artists